"Rock and Roll Never Forgets" is a song written by American singer-songwriter Bob Seger. The song first appeared on Seger's ninth studio album Night Moves (1976). The song was released in early 1977 as the third and final single from the album. The song peaked at No. 41 on the Billboard Hot 100, charting less successfully than the previous two singles. Nevertheless, "Rock and Roll Never Forgets" remains popular with Seger fans, and has become a staple of classic rock radio.

Background
According to Seger, he wrote this song after attending a high school reunion. "I wanted to just write an honest appraisal of where I was at that moment in time," he said. "I was 31 years old and I was damn glad to be here." The song is accompanied by a mid-tempo sound and Seger's signature raspy vocals. 

Seger expanded:

The song is about aging and the ongoing power of rock music.  The song advises the 31 year old listener to return to the rock 'n' roll she loved when she was 16. The song also serves as a tribute to Chuck Berry, who is mentioned in the line "Well all of Chuck's children are out there playing his licks/Get into your kicks/Come back baby rock and roll never forgets."

Personnel
Credits are adapted from the liner notes of Seger's 2003 Greatest Hits 2 compilation.

Bob Seger – lead vocals

The Silver Bullet Band
Drew Abbott – guitar
Chris Campbell – bass
Charlie Allen Martin – drums
Alto Reed – saxophone
Robyn Robbins – piano, organ

Reception
Rolling Stone praised the song as "no-bullshit, horn-slathered Silver Bullet crunch with a nod to Chuck Berry (who's name-checked in the last verse) – makes the case for rock's longevity as well as the lyrics do."  Billboard said that the "standard riffs played at intense energy levels by the rhythm section make an almost ironic counterpoint to the Van Morrison-type lyrics about the funky fun of the golden days of young rock music."  Cash Box said that it "rocks the hardest [among the Night Moves singles], without losing the melodic and harmonic interest" and that a "really catchy intro is icing on the cake as this record builds to an exciting close with rollicking horns and a turned-on lead vocal." Record World said that "it's infectious, fast-paced rock 'n' roll with a wistful message."

Classic Rock History critic Janey Roberts rated it as Seger's 6th best song, calling it "One of the greatest album-opening rock and roll songs ever released."

References

Bob Seger songs
Songs written by Bob Seger
1977 songs
Song recordings produced by Bob Seger
1977 singles
Capitol Records singles
Song recordings produced by Punch Andrews